Vercana is a comune (municipality) in the Province of Como in the Italian region Lombardy, located about  north of Milan and about  northeast of Como.

Vercana borders the following municipalities: Colico, Domaso, Gera Lario, Livo, Montemezzo, Samolaco, Trezzone.

Demographic evolution

References

Cities and towns in Lombardy